Czech Lion Award for Best Film is one of the awards given to the best Czech motion picture.

Winners

External links

Awards for best film
Czech Lion Awards
Awards established in 1993